This is a list of handprint ceremonies for the Grauman's Chinese Theatre in Hollywood, California (originally "Grauman's Chinese Theatre"). Footprints and signatures are also included, and in some cases imprints of other objects:
Sonja Henie imprinted her ice skates.
John Barrymore imprinted the side of his face, a nod to his nickname "The Great Profile".
Roy Rogers, in addition to having his horse Trigger's hoofprints in his square, imprinted his revolver.
Mel Brooks wore a prosthetic sixth finger.
Eleanor Powell imprinted a pair of her tap shoes.
Jimmy Durante imprinted his nose.

1920s

 Norma Talmadge (post dated for the opening day May 18, 1927)
 Mary Pickford (April 30, 1927)
 Douglas Fairbanks (April 30, 1927)
 Norma Shearer (August 1, 1927)
 Harold Lloyd (November 21, 1927)
 William S. Hart (November 28, 1927)
 Tom Mix and Tony the Wonder Horse (December 12, 1927)
 Colleen Moore (December 19, 1927)
 Gloria Swanson (circa 1927)
 Constance Talmadge (circa 1927)
 Pola Negri (April 2, 1928)
 Bebe Daniels (May 11, 1929)
 Marion Davies (May 13, 1929)
 Janet Gaynor (May 29, 1929)
 Joan Crawford (September 14, 1929)

1930s

 Ann Harding (August 30, 1930)
 Raoul Walsh (November 14, 1930)
 Wallace Beery (January 31, 1931)
 Marie Dressler (January 31, 1931)
 Jackie Cooper (December 12, 1931)
 Eddie Cantor (March 9, 1932)
 Diana Wynyard (January 26, 1933)
 The Marx Brothers (February 17, 1933)
 Jean Harlow (September 25 and September 29, 1933)
 Maurice Chevalier (December 4, 1934)
 Jeanette MacDonald (December 4, 1934)
 Shirley Temple (March 14, 1935)
 Joe E. Brown (March 5, 1936)
 Al Jolson (March 12, 1936)
 Freddie Bartholomew (April 4, 1936)
 Bing Crosby (April 8, 1936)
 Victor McLaglen (May 25, 1936)
 William Powell and Myrna Loy (October 20, 1936)
 Clark Gable and W. S. Van Dyke (January 20, 1937)
 Dick Powell and Joan Blondell (February 10, 1937)
 Fredric March (April 21, 1937)
 May Robson (April 22, 1937)
 Tyrone Power and Loretta Young (May 31, 1937)
 Sonja Henie (June 28, 1937)
 The Ritz Brothers (September 22, 1937)
 Eleanor Powell (December 23, 1937)
 Don Ameche (January 27, 1938)
 Fred Astaire (February 4, 1938)
 Deanna Durbin (February 7, 1938)
 Alice Faye and Tony Martin (March 20, 1938)
 Edgar Bergen and Charlie McCarthy (July 20, 1938)
 Jean Hersholt (October 11, 1938)
 Mickey Rooney (October 18, 1938)
 Nelson Eddy (December 28, 1938)
 Ginger Rogers (September 5, 1939)
 Judy Garland (October 10, 1939)
 Jane Withers (November 6, 1939)

1940s

 Linda Darnell (March 18, 1940)
 Rosa Grauman (mother of theatre owner, Sid) and George Raft (March 25, 1940)
 John Barrymore (September 5, 1940)
 Jack Benny (January 13, 1941)
 Carmen Miranda (March 24, 1941)
 Barbara Stanwyck and Robert Taylor (June 11, 1941)
 Rudy Vallée (July 21, 1941)
 Cecil B. DeMille (August 7, 1941)
 The Family of Judge James K. Hardy (August 15, 1941)
 Abbott and Costello (December 8, 1941)
 Edward Arnold (January 6, 1942)
 Joan Fontaine (May 26, 1942)
 Red Skelton (June 18, 1942)
 Greer Garson and Mrs. Miniver (July 23, 1942)
 Edward G. Robinson (July 24, 1942)
 Henry Fonda, Rita Hayworth, Charles Boyer (July 24, 1942)
 Charles Laughton (July 24, 1942)
 Bob Hope and Dorothy Lamour (February 5, 1943)
 Betty Grable (February 15, 1943)
 Monty Woolley (May 28, 1943)
 Gary Cooper (August 13, 1943)
 Esther Williams and Private Joe Brain (August 1, 1944)
 Jack Oakie (February 21, 1945)
 Jimmy Durante (October 31, 1945)
 Sid Grauman (January 24, 1946)
 Gene Tierney (January 24, 1946)
 Irene Dunne (July 8, 1946)
 Rex Harrison (July 8, 1946)
 Margaret O'Brien (August 15, 1946)
 Humphrey Bogart (August 21, 1946)
 Louella Parsons (September 30, 1946)
 Ray Milland (April 17, 1947)
 Lauritz Melchior (November 17, 1947)
 James Stewart (February 13, 1948)
 Van Johnson (March 25, 1948)
 George Jessel (March 1, 1949)
 Roy Rogers and Trigger (April 21, 1949)
 Richard Widmark and Charles Nelson (April 24, 1949)
 Jeanne Crain (October 17, 1949)
 Jean Hersholt (October 20, 1949)
 Anne Baxter and Gregory Peck (December 15, 1949)
 Gene Autry and Champion (December 23, 1949)

1950s

 John Wayne (January 25, 1950)
 Lana Turner (May 24, 1950)
 Bette Davis (November 6, 1950)
 William Lundigan (December 29, 1950)
 Cary Grant (July 16, 1951)
 Susan Hayward (August 10, 1951)
 Hildegard Knef (as Hildegarde Neff) (December 13, 1951)
 Oskar Werner (December 13, 1951)
 Jane Wyman (September 17, 1952)
 Ava Gardner (October 21, 1952)
 Clifton Webb (December 7, 1952)
 Olivia de Havilland (December 9, 1952)
 Adolph Zukor (January 5, 1953)
 Ezio Pinza (January 26, 1953)
 Donald O'Connor and mother Effie (February 25, 1953)
 Marilyn Monroe and Jane Russell (June 26, 1953)
 Jean Simmons (September 24, 1953)
 Danny Thomas (January 26, 1954)
 James Mason (March 30, 1954)
 Alan Ladd (May 12, 1954)
 Edmund Purdom (August 30, 1954)
 Van Heflin (October 8, 1954)
 George Murphy (November 8, 1954)
 Yul Brynner (March 22, 1956)
 Deborah Kerr (March 22, 1956)
 Elizabeth Taylor, Rock Hudson, and George Stevens (September 26, 1956)
 Elmer C. Rhoden and Richard Bakalyan (September 16, 1958)
 Rosalind Russell (February 19, 1959)

1960s

 Cantinflas (December 28, 1960)
 Doris Day (January 19, 1961)
 Natalie Wood (December 5, 1961)
 Charlton Heston (January 18, 1962)
 Sophia Loren (July 26, 1962)
 Kirk Douglas (November 1, 1962)
 Paul Newman and Joanne Woodward (May 25, 1963)
 Jack Lemmon and Shirley MacLaine (June 29, 1963)
 Mervyn LeRoy (October 15, 1963)
 Hayley Mills (February 22, 1964)
 Dean Martin (March 21, 1964)
 Peter Sellers (June 3, 1964)
 Debbie Reynolds (January 14, 1965)
 Marcello Mastroianni (February 8, 1965)
 Frank Sinatra (July 20, 1965)
 Julie Andrews (March 26, 1966)
 Dick Van Dyke (June 25, 1966)
 Steve McQueen (March 21, 1967)
 Sidney Poitier (June 23, 1967)
 Anthony Quinn (December 21, 1968)
 Danny Kaye (October 19, 1969)
 Gene Kelly (November 24, 1969)

1970s

 Francis X. Bushman (November 17, 1970)
 Ali MacGraw (December 14, 1972)
 Jack Nicholson (June 17, 1974)
 KISS (February 20, 1976)
 Tom Bradley and Ted Mann (May 18, 1977)
 Herbie the Love Bug (July 11, 1977), leaving an imprint of tire treads
 Darth Vader (August 3, 1977)
 C-3PO (Anthony Daniels), R2-D2 (Kenny Baker) (August 3, 1977)
 George Burns (November 25, 1979)

1980s

 John Travolta (June 2, 1980)
 Burt Reynolds (September 24, 1981)
 Rhonda Fleming (September 28, 1981)
 Sylvester Stallone (June 29, 1983)
 George Lucas and Steven Spielberg (May 16, 1984)
 Donald Duck and Clarence Nash (May 21, 1984)
 Clint Eastwood (August 21, 1984)
 Mickey Rooney (February 18, 1986)
 Eddie Murphy and Hollywood's 100th Anniversary (May 14, 1987)

1990s

Cast of Star Trek (December 5, 1991)
 Gene Roddenberry
 William Shatner
 Leonard Nimoy 
 DeForest Kelley 
 James Doohan 
 Walter Koenig 
 Nichelle Nichols 
 George Takei
 Harrison Ford (June 3, 1992)
 Michael Keaton  (June 15, 1992)
 Tom Cruise (June 28, 1993)
 Mel Gibson  (August 23, 1993)
 Arnold Schwarzenegger (July 15, 1994)
 Meryl Streep  (September 25, 1994)
 Whoopi Goldberg (February 2, 1995)
 Bruce Willis (May 18, 1995)
 Steven Seagal (July 10, 1995)
 Jim Carrey (November 1, 1995)
 Jackie Chan (January 5, 1997)
 Johnny Grant (May 13, 1997)
 Robert Zemeckis (July 8, 1997)
 Michael Douglas (September 10, 1997)
 Al Pacino (October 16, 1997)
 Denzel Washington (January 15, 1998)
 Walter Matthau (April 2, 1998)
 Warren Beatty (May 21, 1998)
 Tom Hanks (July 23, 1998)
 Danny Glover (July 7, 1998)
 Robin Williams (December 22, 1998)
 Susan Sarandon (January 11, 1999)
 William F. "Bill" Hertz (March 18, 1999)
 Ron Howard (March 23, 1999)
 Sean Connery (April 13, 1999)
 Richard Gere (July 26, 1999)
 Terry Semel and Bob Daly (September 30, 1999)

2000s

 Anthony Hopkins (January 11, 2001)
 Nicolas Cage (August 14, 2001)
 Martin Lawrence (November 19, 2001)
 John Woo (May 21, 2002)
 Morgan Freeman (June 5, 2002)
 Christopher Walken (October 8, 2004)
 Jack Valenti (December 6, 2004)
 Sherry Lansing (February 16, 2005)
 Adam Sandler (May 17, 2005)
 Johnny Depp (September 16, 2005)
 Samuel L. Jackson (January 30, 2006)
 Kevin Costner (September 6, 2006)
 Brad Pitt, George Clooney, Matt Damon and Jerry Weintraub (June 5, 2007)
 Daniel Radcliffe, Emma Watson and Rupert Grint (July 9, 2007)
 Johnny Grant (July 9, 2007)
 Will Smith (December 10, 2007)
 Michael Caine (July 11, 2008)
 Hugh Jackman (April 21, 2009)
 Robert Downey, Jr. (December 7, 2009)

2010s

 Jerry Bruckheimer (May 17, 2010)
 Cher (November 18, 2010)
 Robert Duvall (January 5, 2011)
 Helen Mirren (March 28, 2011)
 Peter O’Toole (April 30, 2011)
 Jennifer Aniston (July 7, 2011) 
 Mickey Rourke (October 31, 2011)
 Alvin and the Chipmunks (November 1, 2011)
 Kristen Stewart, Robert Pattinson and Taylor Lautner (November 3, 2011)
 Rita Moreno, Russ Tamblyn and George Chakiris (November 15, 2011)
 David Guetta (December 3, 2011)
 The Smurfs (December 13, 2011)
 Michael Jackson (January 26, 2012)
 Kim Novak (April 14, 2012)
 Lee Byung-Hun and Ahn Sung-ki (June 23, 2012)
 Christopher Nolan (July 7, 2012)
 Simon Cowell, Demi Lovato, Britney Spears, and LA Reid (September 11, 2012) 
 Robert De Niro (February 4, 2013)
 Jane Fonda (April 27, 2013)
 Jackie Chan (June 6, 2013)
 Jerry Maren (September 18, 2013)
 Sandra Bullock (September 25, 2013)
 Afrojack (October 5, 2013)
 Feng Xiaogang (November 1, 2013)
 Emma Thompson (November 7, 2013)
 John Goodman (November 14, 2013)
 Ben Stiller (December 3, 2013)
 Ford Mustang (December 5, 2013)
 Jerry Lewis (April 12, 2014)
 Melissa McCarthy (July 2, 2014)
 Mel Brooks (September 8, 2014)
 Peter Cullen (September 30, 2014)
 Gena Rowlands (December 5, 2014)
 Ethan Hawke (January 8, 2015)
 Vince Vaughn (March 4, 2015)
 Christopher Plummer (March 27, 2015)
 Vin Diesel (April 1, 2015)
 Dwayne Johnson (May 19, 2015)
 Justin Lin, Zhao Wei and Huang Xiaoming (June 3, 2015)
 Katy Perry and Jeremy Scott (September 8, 2015)
 Jennifer Lawrence, Josh Hutcherson and Liam Hemsworth (October 31, 2015)
 Quentin Tarantino (January 5, 2016)
 Francis Ford Coppola (April 29, 2016)
 Roland Emmerich (June 20, 2016)
 Tim Burton (September 8, 2016)
 Jeffrey Katzenberg (September 29, 2016)
 Jessica Chastain (November 3, 2016)
 Donnie Yen (November 30, 2016)
 Emma Stone and Ryan Gosling (December 7, 2016)
 Jeff Bridges (January 6, 2017)
 Carl Reiner and Rob Reiner (April 7, 2017)
 Ridley Scott (May 17, 2017)
 Michael Bay (May 23, 2017)
 Stan Lee (July 18, 2017)
 Kenneth Branagh (October 26, 2017)
 Mariah Carey (November 1, 2017)
 Lionel Richie (March 7, 2018)
 Cicely Tyson (April 27, 2018)
 Carrie Fisher (May 24, 2018)
 Quincy Jones (November 27, 2018)
 Pitbull (December 14, 2018)
 Sam Elliott (January 7, 2019)
 Billy Crystal (April 12, 2019)
 Robert Downey Jr., Chris Evans, Chris Hemsworth, Mark Ruffalo, Jeremy Renner, Scarlett Johansson and Kevin Feige (April 23, 2019) 
 Johnny Galecki, Jim Parsons, Kaley Cuoco, Simon Helberg, Kunal Nayyar, Mayim Bialik and Melissa Rauch (May 1, 2019)
 Keanu Reeves (May 14, 2019)
 Kevin Smith and Jason Mewes (October 14, 2019)
 Kevin Hart (December 10, 2019)

2020s
 Patrick Stewart (January 13, 2020)
 Michael Madsen (November 17, 2020)
 Canelo Alvarez (March 18, 2021)
 Regina King (October 28, 2021)
 Lily Tomlin (April 22, 2022)
 The Smashing Pumpkins (May 12, 2022)
 Priscilla Presley, Lisa Marie Presley, Riley Keough, Finley Aaron Love Lockwood and Harper Vivienne Ann Lockwood (June 21, 2022)
 Diane Keaton (August 11, 2022)
 Michael G. Wilson and Barbara Broccoli (September 21, 2022)
 Jamie Lee Curtis (October 13, 2022)
 James Cameron and Jon Landau (January 12, 2023)

Without handprints
In recent years, there have been a number of ceremonies for celebrities, famous animals, and fictional characters, after which the handprints have not been placed in the forecourt. These include:

 Kobe Bryant (February 19, 2011)
 Uggie (June 25, 2012)
 Britney Spears, Simon Cowell, Demi Lovato and L.A. Reid (September 12, 2012)
 Optimus Prime (September 30, 2014)
 Tamer Hosny (August 9, 2017)

References

External links

Clickable map of star handprints & footprints
Kevin Smith & Jason Mewes Imprint Ceremony
Chinese Theatres Youtube Official Channel

Culture of Los Angeles
Culture of Hollywood, Los Angeles
Landmarks in Los Angeles
Uses of shoes
TCL Chinese Theatre